In linguistics, a vocative or vocative expression, is a phrase used to identify the addressee of an utterance. The underlined phrases in each of the following English sentences are examples of vocatives:

, your table is ready.

I'm afraid, that your card has been declined.

Quit playing around, .

Syntactically, vocatives are noun phrases which are isolated from the structure of their containing sentence, not being a dependent of the verb. In some languages, vocatives are marked morphologically with a particular grammatical case, the vocative case. English lacks a vocative case, but sets vocatives off from their containing sentence in speech by a particular intonational pattern, and in writing by the use of commas.

Function
Traditionally, the function of vocatives has been divided into two main categories: calls and addresses. A call serves to catch the attention of the person being addressed, or to pick them out from a larger pool of potential addressees, as in the following examples:

 Hey lady, you dropped your piano!
 You in the red shirt, get over here.

An address merely serves to reiterate, clarify, or emphasize the connection between the speaker and the addressee, as in:

 You've made an excellent choice, dear boy.

The particular choice of vocative may indicate the relative social status or familiarity of the speakers. For example, sir and madam are considered polite terms to use when addressing strangers or, in some cases, those of higher social standing.

See also
 Kinship terminology

References

Linguistic units